LaLumiere was a South Shore Line flag stop located at Wilhelm Road in LaPorte County, Indiana. The station opened prior to 1910 and closed on July 5, 1994, as part of an NICTD service revision which also saw the closure of Ambridge, Kemil Road, Willard Avenue, Rolling Prairie, and New Carlisle.

References

Former South Shore Line stations
Former railway stations in Indiana
Railway stations in LaPorte County, Indiana
Railway stations closed in 1994